South Georgia is a British island in the southern Atlantic Ocean.

South Georgia may also refer to:
South Georgia and the South Sandwich Islands, a British overseas territory centered around South Georgia
South Georgia State College, in the cities of Douglas and Waycross in the U.S. state of Georgia
The southern part of Georgia (country)
The southern (coastal plain) half of the US State of Georgia
Southeast Georgia, the southeastern region of Georgia, United States
Southwest Georgia, the southwestern region of Georgia, United States

See also
Georgia (disambiguation)